The Cannibal is the fifth of Nelson DeMille's novels about NYPD Sergeant Joe Ryker. It was first published in 1975 with the protagonist originally as Joe Keller. The novel was then republished in 1989 with the author listed as Jack Cannon.

External links

1975 American novels
Novels by Nelson DeMille